Naima Melsa Gule Avako is a Ugandan politician and member of the parliament. She was elected in office as a female representative in parliament for Yumbe district during the 2021 Uganda general elections.

She is a member of the ruling National Resistance Movement party.

See also 

 National Resistance Movement
 List of members of the eleventh Parliament of Uganda
 Parliament of Uganda
 Yumbe District
 Member of Parliament.

References

External links 

 Website of the Parliament of Uganda.

Yumbe District
Members of the Parliament of Uganda
Women members of the Parliament of Uganda
National Resistance Movement politicians
21st-century Ugandan women politicians
21st-century Ugandan politicians
Living people
Year of birth missing (living people)